Michael Wainwright (born 4 November 1980) is an English former rugby league footballer who played on the . He played for Hunslet Hawks, Dewsbury Rams, Wakefield Trinity Wildcats, Batley Bulldogs and spent four seasons with Castleford Tigers.

Playing career
Wainwright made his senior debut for Hunslet Hawks after being signed from Leeds in 2001.
He signed a one-year contract to stay with the Castleford Tigers for the 2009 season. Wainwright was not in the starting line-up at the start of the 2009 season. Later he was called back into the side due to injuries, and gave some solid performances. He was awarded a new contract for the 2010 season. Wainwright played with Castleford through 2010. He was released by Castleford after over 100 appearances for the club. He later joined Dewsbury for the 2011 season.

References

External links
(archived by web.archive.org) Profile at castigers.com

1980 births
Living people
Batley Bulldogs players
Castleford Tigers players
Dewsbury Rams players
Hunslet R.L.F.C. players
English rugby league players
Rugby league players from Leeds
Rugby league wingers
Sportspeople from Morley, West Yorkshire
Wakefield Trinity players